Edgefield Secondary School (EFSS) is a co-educational government secondary school in Punggol, Singapore.

History
Mr Leong Kok Kee was assigned to Edgefield Secondary School as the Principal in 2011 by the Ministry of Education.

On 12 July 2013, the school had its official opening ceremony.

In 2015, the first batch of Secondary 4 Express students had 93.3% scoring 5 or more passes for O-Levels, which outdid the national average of 83.3%.

The school took part in SG50 as well by setting a new record in the Singapore Book of Records. In collaboration with the Singapore Taekwondo Federation (STF), 1,400 Taekwondo students from Edgefield Secondary School gathered to create a human formation of the SG50 logo to mark Singapore's Golden Jubilee. Students broke 2,800 planks in a team formation, setting the new record for the “Most Number of Planks Broken in Kicking Sequence” in the largest local Taekwondo demonstration.

On 21 October 2016, then vice-principal Mr Lee Peck Ping took over as the new principal after Mr Leong Kok Kee was transferred to Regent Secondary School.

In 2018, phone lockers were also introduced to allow teachers to keep the students phones in their classroom locked away till the end of the day. In 2022, the vice-principal introduced the Red-Zone area in the classroom blocks. Students seen with their mobile phone devices would have their phones confiscated. 

The school has also undergone a major aesthetic revamp around school in 2022.

Principals

Programmes
The school is the second school in Singapore to have taekwondo as a compulsory curricular activity. It is said that the sport helps to instill discipline, respect and perseverance in every student. It also serves its purpose in training self-defence. By the end of Secondary 4, most students are able to achieve black belts. The CCA took part in several competitions every year and did extremely well, exceeding the expectations of the school. In 2018, the taekwondo programme was split into two tiers - the lower and upper tier, making it optional for the upper secondary students. Hence, they are given the choice to opt out of the programme if they wish to.

For Secondary 1 students, the school has an Apple Education Programme(AEP) to enable them to learn how to use macOS. Thereafter throughout the rest of their lower secondary years, they will attend the Future Ready Programme(FRP) which is a combination of the previously known programmes such as CBL, ATS and ALP. 

DSA-Sec to Edgefield Sec can be applied in three domains: LLP(Taekwondo), ALP(Innovation) and Leadership.

Co-Curricular Activities (CCAs) 
Edgefield Secondary School has a wide variety of CCAs for students to choose from. Currently, there are 23 active CCAs for students to join.

^Golf CCA was removed in 2017 ,  Thinkers Society was removed in 2022

References 

Punggol
Educational institutions established in 2011
2011 establishments in Singapore
Secondary schools in Singapore